The men's 400 metres T36 event at the 2020 Summer Paralympics in Tokyo, took place on 31 August 2021.

Records
Prior to the competition, the existing records were as follows:

Results
The final took place on 31 August 2021, at 11:20:

References

Men's 400 metres T36
2021 in men's athletics